Chuy-Atasevo (Seyäle-Ätäs) is a rural locality (a village) in Bazitamaksky Selsoviet, Ilishevsky District, Bashkortostan, Russia. The population was 310 as of 2010. There are 4 streets.

Geography 
Chuy-Atasevo is located 40 km northeast of Verkhneyarkeyevo (the district's administrative centre) by road. Bazitamak is the nearest rural locality.

References 

Rural localities in Ilishevsky District